Orcustus is the first full-length album by the Norwegian black metal band Orcustus. It was released by Southern Lord in March 2009.

Track listing
"Coil" – 5:13
"Of Sophistry, Obsession and Paranoia" – 8:49
"Conversion" – 5:21
"Jesus Christ Patricide" – 7:45
"Death and Dissolution" – 4:42
"Ego Sum Chaos" – 6:03
"Asphyxiokenisis" – 3:50

Credits
Orcustus
Taipan (Christer Jensen) – vocals, guitar (2–4 & 6)
Dirge Rep (Per Husebø) – drums, invocation (2), spoken word (7)

Bass guitarists
Infernus – (1, 4–7)
Tormentor – (2), guitar (1, 2, 5–7),
Vrangsinn – (3)

Backing vocals
Radek – (1, 4 & 5)

Other notes
The music was written between 2003 and 2007 by Taipan and lyrics by Dirge Rep between 2003 and 2007.

It was recorded and produced at Misantrof Studios by Vrangsinn and Orcustus in 2007. Vocals were recorded at Slimecave Studios by Radek and Taipan in 2007 and 2008. The album was mixed at Conclave Studios by Bjørnar E. Nilsen and Taipan in 2008. Graphic art and layout are by Dirge Rep.

References

External links
Southern Lord

2009 albums
Orcustus albums
Southern Lord Records albums